Phasiops is a genus of bristle flies in the family Tachinidae. There is at least one described species in Phasiops, P. flavus.

Distribution
United States.

References

Dexiinae
Diptera of North America
Monotypic Brachycera genera
Tachinidae genera
Taxa named by Daniel William Coquillett